"Bamboogie" is a song by short-lived British house production act Bamboo. It heavily samples the song "Get Down Tonight" by KC and the Sunshine Band, which became a US number-one hit in 1975. Following airplay exposure in December 1997, "Bamboogie" was released in the United Kingdom on 5 January 1998.

Upon its release, "Bamboogie" debuted and peaked at No. 2 on the UK Singles Chart on 11 January 1998, behind "Never Ever" by All Saints. According to the Official Charts Company, "Never Ever" beat "Bamboogie" to the top spot by 557 copies. The single experienced worldwide success over the next few months, reaching the top 10 in Finland, Iceland, Ireland, Italy, and New Zealand. The music video for "Bamboogie" is a compilation of vintage cartoon footage.

Critical reception
Chris Finan from Music Weeks RM Dance Update gave "Bamboogie" four out of five, describing it as "a happy cheeky disco moment that first appeared on a Bud Ice TV commercial and now due for release. Very commercially aimed without doubt in its original form, but added more club leverage from the excellent Lisa Marie Experience and the more than capable Graeme Park. More likely to do well over the coming festive period for its feelgood factor."

Track listings

 UK and Australian CD single "Bamboogie" (radio edit) – 3:33
 "Bamboogie" (Lisa Marie Vocal Experience remix) – 7:44
 "Bamboogie" (12-inch vocal mix) – 7:48
 "Vegas" – 5:45

 UK cassette single "Bamboogie" (radio edit) – 3:33
 "Bamboogie" (12-inch vocal mix) – 7:48
 "Vegas" – 6:05

 European CD single "Bamboogie" (radio edit) – 3:33
 "Vegas" – 5:45

 French CD single'
 "Bamboogie" (radio edit) – 3:33
 "Bamboogie" (12-inch vocal mix) – 7:48

Charts

Weekly charts

Year-end charts

Certifications

References

1997 songs
1998 debut singles
Animated music videos
Hut Records singles
Songs about dancing
Songs written by Harry Wayne Casey
Virgin Records singles